Jesús Hermida Pineda OAXS (27 June 1937 – 4 May 2015) was a Spanish journalist. He worked as a U.S. correspondent for Televisión Española in New York City, New York.

Hermida was born Huelva. He died from a stroke in Madrid, at the age of 77.

Honours 
 Knight Grand Cross of the Civil Order of Alfonso X, the Wise (Posthumous, Kingdom of Spain, 9 October 2015).

References

1937 births
2015 deaths
Spanish television journalists
Spanish male writers
People from Huelva
Male journalists